Taharoa ( or ) is a small village on the west coast of the North Island of New Zealand, to the southwest of Kawhia Harbour and overlooking Lake Taharoa.

History and culture

It was at times the temporary home of the great Te Rauparaha used mainly as a battle ground on the vast expanses of sand dunes evident by the number of finds over the years, by 1822 they were being forced out of their land by stronger northern tribes. Te Rauparaha then began a fighting retreat or migration southwards, one which ended with them controlling a small part of the North Island and particularly Kapiti Island, which became the tribal stronghold.

Marae

Taharoa has two marae: Āruka Marae and Tahaaroa meeting house, and Te Kōraha Marae and Te Ōhākī meeting house. Both are affiliated with the Waikato Tainui hapū of Ngāti Mahuta ki te Hauāuru and Ngāti Rangitaka.

Iron sand mining 

The main industrial activity is iron sand mining, run by New Zealand Steel, which began in 1972 was exporting about  a year, mainly to Japan, with small quantities to South Korea and China. A 1993 study put reserves at 205 Mt of high concentrate and 360 Mt of lower grade sand. An $80m investment in 2014 boosted potential exports to 4 Mt a year.

The roadway used for the move is now an airstrip.

The three bulk carriers used to transport the sand, Taharoa Destiny, Taharoa Providence and Taharoa Eos, require a pilot to berth at the buoy and also a support boat to move ropes and pipes.

The mine employs about 150 workers, though only 108 were recorded as working in the whole Taharoa area in the 2013 census. To house its workers, NZ Steel built 65 houses, a hall, Kōhanga Reo, school, shop, and fire and ambulance facilities in the village.

Demographics 
The settlement is part of the larger Herangi statistical area.

Taharoa had a population of 171 at the 2018 New Zealand census, a decrease of 9 people (−5.0%) since the 2013 census, and an increase of 6 people (3.6%) since the 2006 census. There were 51 households, comprising 87 males and 84 females, giving a sex ratio of 1.04 males per female. The median age was 31.5 years (compared with 37.4 years nationally), with 45 people (26.3%) aged under 15 years, 36 (21.1%) aged 15 to 29, 81 (47.4%) aged 30 to 64, and 6 (3.5%) aged 65 or older.

Ethnicities were 15.8% European/Pākehā, 94.7% Māori, and 3.5% Pacific peoples. People may identify with more than one ethnicity.

Although some people chose not to answer the census's question about religious affiliation, 49.1% had no religion, 29.8% were Christian, and 7.0% had Māori religious beliefs.

Of those at least 15 years old, 6 (4.8%) people had a bachelor's or higher degree, and 30 (23.8%) people had no formal qualifications. The median income was $38,700, compared with $31,800 nationally. 45 people (35.7%) earned over $70,000 compared to 17.2% nationally. The employment status of those at least 15 was that 60 (47.6%) people were employed full-time, 24 (19.0%) were part-time, and 3 (2.4%) were unemployed.

Herangi statistical area

Herangi had a population of 990 at the 2018 New Zealand census, a decrease of 66 people (−6.2%) since the 2013 census, and a decrease of 189 people (−16.0%) since the 2006 census. There were 402 households, comprising 513 males and 477 females, giving a sex ratio of 1.08 males per female. The median age was 44.1 years (compared with 37.4 years nationally), with 198 people (20.0%) aged under 15 years, 141 (14.2%) aged 15 to 29, 486 (49.1%) aged 30 to 64, and 165 (16.7%) aged 65 or older.

Ethnicities were 73.6% European/Pākehā, 38.2% Māori, 1.5% Pacific peoples, 0.6% Asian, and 0.6% other ethnicities. People may identify with more than one ethnicity.

The percentage of people born overseas was 7.0, compared with 27.1% nationally.

Although some people chose not to answer the census's question about religious affiliation, 54.8% had no religion, 33.0% were Christian, 1.8% had Māori religious beliefs and 0.0% had other religions.

Of those at least 15 years old, 78 (9.8%) people had a bachelor's or higher degree, and 204 (25.8%) people had no formal qualifications. The median income was $29,800, compared with $31,800 nationally. 114 people (14.4%) earned over $70,000 compared to 17.2% nationally. The employment status of those at least 15 was that 402 (50.8%) people were employed full-time, 150 (18.9%) were part-time, and 9 (1.1%) were unemployed.

Education

References

External links 
 1:50,000 map
 1953 one inch map
 1934 map
 Google Street View of Taharoa village

Photos
 Taharoa Express at mooring buoy
 Ironsand mine
 1938 aerial views of lake and village
 aerial views 1944-1983
 1906 children

Waitomo District
Populated places in Waikato